A Sawmill Hazard is a 1913 American short silent film drama. The film starred Earle Foxe and Alice Hollister in the lead roles.

Cast
 Alice Hollister
 Earle Foxe
 Helen Lindroth
 Robert G. Vignola
 Miriam Cooper

External links
 

American silent short films
1913 drama films
1913 films
American black-and-white films
Kalem Company films
1913 short films
Silent American drama films
Films directed by Kenean Buel
1910s American films